Hsinchu Municipal Ximen Elementary School was established on August 1, 1952. The school includes the Chun-Li and other eight school districts. The school is part of the department within the Hsinchu City's Department of Education. The Hsinchu City Department of Education is required to provide nine years of education, upon the laws of the Ministry of Education.

Staff
The school has 111 staff.

References

1952 establishments in Taiwan
Educational institutions established in 1952
Primary schools in Taiwan
Schools in Hsinchu